La cobarde (English title:The craven) is a Mexican telenovela produced by Televisa and transmitted by Telesistema Mexicano.

Cast 
María Rivas
Julio Alemán
Prudencia Grifell
Anita Blanch
Virginia Manzano
Ramón Bugarini
Jorge del Campo
Ernesto Alonso

References

External links

Mexican telenovelas
1962 telenovelas
Televisa telenovelas
1962 Mexican television series debuts
1962 Mexican television series endings
Spanish-language telenovelas